Dewa is a village in Jakhania tehsil, Ghazipur district, Uttar Pradesh, India. It forms a part of Varanasi division and is situated on the border of Ghazipur-Azamgarh districts. The village is served by the nearby railway station at Dullahpur.

Model Village
In 2015, Deva was adopted as a Model village by Manoj Sinha, the Member of Parliament and Minister of State for Communication and Railways in the Government of India. Since then a new initiative to develop this village is taking shape.

References

External links
Villages in Ghazipur  Uttar Pradesh

Villages in Ghazipur district